Paro International Airport  is the sole international airport of the four airports in Bhutan.

Flights to and from Paro are allowed under visual meteorological conditions only and are restricted to daylight hours from sunrise to sunset. Paro airport was the only airport in Bhutan until 2011.

History

In 1968, the Indian Border Roads Organisation built an airstrip in the Paro valley, which was initially used for on-call helicopter operations by the Indian Armed Forces on behalf of the Royal Government of Bhutan. Bhutan's first airline, Drukair, was established by Royal Charter on 5 April 1981.

The airport was constructed with a runway  in length, giving the Bhutanese government specific requirements for a choice of aircraft to be operated from Paro. They required an 18–20 seat STOL-capable aircraft with operating capabilities which included a high service ceiling, high rate of climb and high manoeuvrability. The major requirement for the aircraft was that it must be capable of flying KolkataParoKolkata, a  round-trip, without refuelling, due to minimal infrastructure being available at Paro. Three aircraft types were considered after flight tests that had been conducted in India and Bhutan between 1978 and 1980; however, none was deemed suitable.

In mid-1981, the Indian government set up a committee to study its own requirements for a light transport aircraft. Based upon this study, the Bhutanese government ordered one Dornier 228-200 for delivery in January 1983, with the option for a second aircraft for delivery in late 1983. The first 18-seat Dornier 228-200 landed at Paro Airport on 14 January 1983. The exact time of landing, the number of passengers on board and even the direction the aircraft was parked on the airport apron were predetermined by the high lama of Paro Dzong.

Drukair inaugurated scheduled revenue flights from Paro on 11 February 1983, with Flight 101 departing Paro for Kolkata and returning the next day as Flight 102. At the time of service commencement, Paro Airport consisted of the runway, a two-room air traffic control building (with the ground floor acting as the check-in counter) and a departure lounge on the lawn. Before the establishment of the Department of Civil Aviation in January 1986, Drukair was responsible for the operation and maintenance of the airport's infrastructure.

A hangar was constructed for the aircraft, which was funded by the Indian government as part of the Paro Airport Development Project.

On 21 November 1988, Drukair's first jet, a BAe 146-100, was delivered to Paro Airport. In 2003, Drukair was seeking a replacement for the BAe 146 and on 19 October 2004 the airline's first Airbus A319-100 arrived in Paro.

Buddha Air became the first international airline to operate charters to Paro in August 2010. Tashi Air, Bhutan's first private airline, was started in December 2011. In 2012, it was reported that 181,659 passengers used the airport.  By 2018, this number had grown to 397,599 and 6,761 flights were handled by the airport. The airport got 4 new structures: modified departure terminal building, cargo building, the relocated substation, and a parallel taxiway.

Facilities
The airport has a single  asphalt runway, and there is one terminal building that was commissioned in 1999. In 2021, the interior was revamped, adding many art pieces.

Airlines and destinations

See also
 Transport in Bhutan
 List of airports in Bhutan

References

External links

BBC World feature on landing at Paro Airport

Airports in Bhutan
Paro District